Benjamin Adelbert Cady (April 11, 1840 – November 27, 1920) was a politician and lawyer.

Born in Granville, Vermont, Cady moved with his parents to Waukesha County, Wisconsin in 1850. He went to Berlin High School in Berlin, Wisconsin and to Milton College. Cady taught school and then served with the 37th Wisconsin Volunteer Infantry Regiment of the Union Army during the American Civil War. He then studied law and was admitted to the Wisconsin bar in 1867 in Waushara County, Wisconsin and lived in Poy Sippi, Wisconsin. Cady served as Waushara County district attorney, on the town board and was chairman of the town board, and on the Waushara County board. He was also in the mercantile, insurance, real estate, and lumber businesses. In 1883, Cady moved to Birnamwood, Shawano County, Wisconsin. He also served as Shawano County district attorney and on the Shawano County Board of Supervisors. In 1909, Cady served in the Wisconsin State Assembly and was a Republican. He also served on the board of education. Cady died at his home in Birnamwood, Wisconsin.

References

1840 births
1920 deaths
People from Granville, Vermont
People from Birnamwood, Wisconsin
People from Waukesha County, Wisconsin
People from Waushara County, Wisconsin
People of Wisconsin in the American Civil War
Union Army soldiers
Milton College alumni
Businesspeople from Wisconsin
Wisconsin lawyers
Mayors of places in Wisconsin
Wisconsin city council members
County supervisors in Wisconsin
School board members in Wisconsin
Republican Party members of the Wisconsin State Assembly
19th-century American lawyers